The 1912 Boston Braves season was the 42nd season of the franchise. Team owner William Hepburn Russell died after the 1911 season and his stock was bought up by a group including Tammany Hall alderman James Gaffney and former baseball manager John Montgomery Ward. The team was renamed the Boston Braves after the Sachems, also known as "Braves", of Tammany Hall.

Regular season

Season standings

Record vs. opponents

Notable transactions 
 June 21, 1912: Doc Miller was traded by the Braves to the Philadelphia Phillies for John Titus.

Roster

Player stats

Batting

Starters by position 
Note: Pos = Position; G = Games played; AB = At bats; H = Hits; Avg. = Batting average; HR = Home runs; RBI = Runs batted in

Other batters 
Note: G = Games played; AB = At bats; H = Hits; Avg. = Batting average; HR = Home runs; RBI = Runs batted in

Pitching

Starting pitchers 
Note: G = Games pitched; IP = Innings pitched; W = Wins; L = Losses; ERA = Earned run average; SO = Strikeouts

Other pitchers 
Note: G = Games pitched; IP = Innings pitched; W = Wins; L = Losses; ERA = Earned run average; SO = Strikeouts

Relief pitchers 
Note: G = Games pitched; W = Wins; L = Losses; SV = Saves; ERA = Earned run average; SO = Strikeouts

References

External links
1912 Boston Braves season at Baseball Reference

Boston Braves seasons
Boston Braves
Boston Braves
1910s in Boston